Ino (minor planet designation: 173 Ino) is a large asteroid and the parent body of the Ino family, located in the central regions of the asteroid belt, approximately  in diameter. It was discovered on 1 August 1877, by French astronomer Alphonse Borrelly at Marseille Observatory in southern France, and named after the queen Ino from Greek mythology. The dark Xk-type asteroid has a rotation period of 6.15 hours.

Orbit and classification 

Ino is the parent body and namesake of the Ino family, an asteroid family in the intermediate main belt with nearly 500 known members. The adjectival form of the asteroid name is "Inoan".

It orbits the Sun in the central main-belt at a distance of 2.2–3.3 AU once every 4 years and 6 months (1,659 days; semi-major axis of 2.74 AU). Its orbit has an eccentricity of 0.21 and an inclination of 14° with respect to the ecliptic. The body's observation arc begins at Düsseldorf-Bilk Observatory in January 1879, five months after its official discovery observation at Marseilles.

Physical characteristics 

In the Tholen classification, Ino is a common carbonaceous C-type, while in the SMASS classification it is a Xk-subtype that transitions between the X-type and uncommon K-type asteroids.

Multiple photometric studies of this asteroid were performed between 1978 and 2002. The combined data gave an irregular, asymmetrical light curve with a period of 6.163 ± 0.005 hours and a brightness variation of 0.10–0.15 in magnitude. The asteroid is rotating in a retrograde direction.

References

External links 
 Asteroid Lightcurve Database (LCDB), query form (info )
 Dictionary of Minor Planet Names, Google books
 Asteroids and comets rotation curves, CdR – Observatoire de Genève, Raoul Behrend
 Discovery Circumstances: Numbered Minor Planets (1)-(5000) – Minor Planet Center
 
 

18770801
Ino
Ino asteroids
Ino
C-type asteroids (Tholen)
Xk-type asteroids (SMASS)